is a passenger railway station in located in the city of Tsu,  Mie Prefecture, Japan, operated by the private railway operator Kintetsu Railway.

Lines
Sakakibara-Onsenguchi  Station is served by the Osaka Line, and is located 95.4 rail kilometers from the starting point of the line at Ōsaka Uehommachi Station.

Station layout
The station was consists of two opposed side platforms. The station is built on the side of a hill, with the platforms at a higher elevation than the station building.

Platforms

Adjacent stations 

.

History
After merging with Osaka Electric Kido on March 15, 1941, the line became the Kansai Express Railway's Osaka Line. This line was merged with the Nankai Electric Railway on June 1, 1944, to form Kintetsu. The station name was changed to its present name on March 1, 1965. On December 18, 1973, due to failure of an ATS system, a runaway train derailed in the Aoyama Tunnel near this station, with 25 fatalities.

Passenger statistics
In fiscal 2019, the station was used by an average of 554 passengers daily (boarding passengers only).

Surrounding area
Sakakibara Onsen
Hojuyama Daikannon-ji
Louvre Sculpture Museum
Tsu City Hakusan Folk Museum

See also
List of railway stations in Japan

References

External links

Kintetsu: Sakakibara-Onsenguchi Station 

Railway stations in Japan opened in 1930
Railway stations in Mie Prefecture
Stations of Kintetsu Railway
Tsu, Mie